Sprouty homolog 2 (Drosophila), also known as SPRY2, is a protein which in humans is encoded by the SPRY2 gene.

Function 

This gene encodes a protein belonging to the sprouty family. The encoded protein contains a carboxyl-terminal cysteine-rich domain essential for the inhibitory activity on receptor tyrosine kinase signaling proteins and is required for growth factor stimulated translocation of the protein to membrane ruffles. In primary dermal endothelial cells this gene is transiently upregulated in response to fibroblast growth factor two. This protein is indirectly involved in the non-cell autonomous inhibitory effect on fibroblast growth factor two signaling. The protein interacts with Cas-Br-M (murine) ectropic retroviral transforming sequence, and can function as a bimodal regulator of epidermal growth factor receptor/mitogen-activated protein kinase signaling. This protein may play a role in alveoli branching during lung development as shown by a similar mouse protein.

SPRY2 is a negative feedback regulator of multiple receptor tyrosine kinases (RTKs) including receptors for fibroblast growth factor (FGF), epidermal growth factor (EGF), and hepatocyte growth factor (HGF).  Antagonization of growth factor mediated pathways, cell migration, and cellular differentiation occurs through the ERK pathway.  Spry2 can also enhance EGFR signaling by sequestering CBL.  Spry gene expression has been reported silenced or repressed in cancer of the breast, liver, lung, prostate, and in lymphoma. Human spry2 expression is localized to the microtubules in unstimulated cells.  All sprouty isoforms inhibit the ERK pathway by themselves, but can also form heterodimers and homodimers which have enhanced inhibition.

Interactions 

SPRY2 has been shown to interact with Cbl gene.

See also 
SPRED1 gene
Neurofibromin 1
SPRY1

References

Further reading

External links 
 
 

SPR domain
Human proteins